Guy Delaye is a French former professional rugby league footballer who represented France in the 1954 Rugby League World Cup, as a .

Career
Delaye, then playing for Marseille XIII, was called up to play the 1954 Rugby League World Cup which was played in France. He takes part to the first two matches of the tournament, remaining in the reserves during the final against Great Britain, the latter winning the tournament.

References

1929 births
1985 deaths
France national rugby league team captains
France national rugby league team players
French rugby league players
Marseille XIII players
Place of birth missing
Rugby league forwards
Rugby league locks
Sporting Olympique Avignon players
Sportspeople from Lyon Metropolis